Vladimira Krckova (born 9 February 1983) also known as VLAD. is a singer, poet, bandleader, composer, producer, actress, director, dancer, choreographer and visual artist. She studied Musical and Dramatic Arts at Brno Conservatory. In 2008, she performed alongside Grammy nominated pianist and composer John Serry Jr. In 2012, she self-released and produced her debut album of original compositions "Go for a Rich Man" with her jazz quartet (Adam Tvrdy on guitar, Petr Dvorsky on double bass and Jan Linhart on drums) that Czech music critic Lubomir Doruzka has credited as "The Most Interesting Music Act Of The Last Several Years" in Mladá Fronta DNES. In 2015, she wrote, directed and produced her official music video "Your Aura on my Lips", with creative audio post-production by Michael Riesman.

Career 
In 2001, during her studies at the conservatory, she appeared in her first theatre role "Rózička" in a musical ballad "Koločava" (directed by Stanislav Moša and music written by Petr Ulrych) in Brno City Theatre; the play was very successful for many years. In 2004, during consultations with Polish director Andrzej Sadowski, she created one woman show "Voice Monodrama" (based on performance loops of a deeply intimate connection of voice and movement) during an artist residency at Villa Decius in Krakow, Poland. In 2005, she participated as a lead singer on an album "Těba" (released by Indies Records) of a Czech folk music group Cymbelín and performed at Colours of Ostrava, a major international music festival in Czechia. In 2007, she appeared as a lead character of "Marylou" in an original multimedia theatre play called "Chat" in Archa Theatre in Prague, Czechia, directed by Jana Svobodová. The same year, she performed at International Music Festioval Cesky Krumlov with her jazz arrangements of French chansons. In 2008, Ms Krckova sang jazz standards as well as original repertoire alongside Anna Polívková in a poetry performance "Záznamy Intimity" by Czech poet Gabriela Onderková. Later that year, she performed in Czech Television New Years TV performance together with Karel Gott. In 2015 (London), she sang with British jazz pianist Trevor Watkis. In 2008 and 2016, she performed with pianist and composer Mark Aanderud (Czechia, Mexico). In 2016 (in Mexico City), she performed with another highly acclaimed Mexican piano player and composer Alex Mercado (named "The Best Mexican Jazz Musician" by Downbeat magazine) and also had her visual art in several collective exhibitions for the first time. As an actress, besides several Czech plays where she starred in lead or featured roles, she appeared in an award-winning Czech feature film "Pohadky pro Emu" ("Christmas for Ema", 2017, directed by Rudolf Havlik), alongside Ondrej Vetchy. In London, Krckova performed her original music with Robin Banerjee (a former Amy Winehouse guitarist). In Czechia, she also repeatedly performed with Emil Viklicky. Earlier in her life, she sang with big bands Zatrestband - where she sang also with Ilona Csakova (conductor Petr Pisa) and Big Band Českého Rozhlasu (conductor Vaclav Kozel).

Personal life

Health 
At the age of 16, she was accepted to study Musical and Dramatic Arts at Brno Conservatory. Shortly after the beginning of her studies, she started to observe inexplicable mood swings, later on diagnosed and treated as a depression. In 2008, she was accepted to study Jazz Performance at New School, New York, but her battle with mental health problems forced her to continue her career path in Europe. After finishing the filming of "Your Aura on my Lips", Ms Krckova relocated to London to expand her career but shortly after relocating, she finally received a correct diagnosis for her lifelong struggles (PTSD) and decided to travel around the world and release all the memories and conditioning that were preventing her from creating as well as living her life. Between years 2018 and 2021, Ms Krckova focused fully on her healing (as an ACOA and also from C-PTSD, mainly caused by being subjected to lifelong narcissistic abuse). This led to a successful recovery.

References  

 Doruzka, Lubomir: "Go for a Rich Man" review in iDNES
 Zatrestband (conductor Petr Pisa)
 Big Band Českého Rozhlasu (conductor Vaclav Kozel) 
music group Cymbelín
 Havlik, Rudolf (film director)
 Sadowski, Andrzej (theatre director)
 Mosa, Stanislav, Ulrych, Petr: "Koločava"
 Cymbelín, "Těba"
 Musicians that participated on "Go for a Rich Man": Tvrdy, Adam, Dvorsky, Petr, Linhart, Jan
 Smekal, Martin, DoP for "Your Aura on my Lips"
 Boruvka, Sarah: "Vladimíra Krčková, a young jazz singer who lives in Prague"
 Cesky Rozhlas Jazz: "Jazzová zpěvačka Vladimíra Krčková pokřtí album"

External links 

 Vladimira Krckova at CSFD
 Vladimira Krckova at Muzikus
 Your Aura on my Lips (Youtube)
 
 Go for a Rich Man (Youtube

Czech women singers
Czech composers
Women composers
Living people
Czech actresses
Czech poets
Czech film producers
Czech women film producers
Czech dancers
1983 births
Brno Conservatory alumni